Pyongyang TV Tower is a free-standing concrete TV tower with an observation deck and a panorama restaurant at a height of  in Pyongyang, North Korea. The tower stands in Kaeson Park in Moranbong-guyok, north of Kim Il-sung Stadium. The tower broadcasts signals for Korean Central Television.

History 
It was built in 1967 to enhance the broadcasting area, which was very poor at the time, and to start colour TV broadcasts.

The Pyongyang TV Tower is chiefly based on the design of the Ostankino Tower in Moscow, which was built at the same time.

Features 
It uses its high-gain reflector antennas and panel antennas to produce a wide coverage of Analog and Digital TV reception, as well for radio reception.

See also
List of towers
 Television in North Korea

References

Towers in North Korea
Buildings and structures in Pyongyang
Radio masts and towers
Observation towers
Restaurant towers
Towers completed in 1968
1968 establishments in North Korea
20th-century architecture in North Korea